Rashid Farivar (born May 15, 1982, in Iran) is an Iranian-born Swedish engineer and politician of the Sweden Democrats party who was elected to the Riksdag in 2022 representing the Västra Götaland County West constituency.

Biography

Early life and education
Farivar was born in Tabriz, Iran in 1982 before moving to the capital Tehran. He studied electrical engineering at the K. N. Toosi University of Technology before moving to Sweden with his family in 2005 and became a Swedish citizen. He subsequently completed a master's degree in engineering at Chalmers University of Technology before starting a PhD but left the university before completing it. He then worked as a design engineer and a test driver within the car industry for Semcon, Volvo Trucks and Volvo Cars.

Farivar speaks Swedish, Persian and English.

Political career
Farivar joined the Sweden Democrats after moving to Sweden and is a board member for the party in Mölndal. For the 2022 Swedish general election, Farivar was elected to the Riksdag to represent Västra Götaland County West constituency and takes up seat 339 in parliament. In the Riksdag he sits on the committees for civil affairs, traffic and the environment.

Political views
In politics, Farivar has called for more strict policies to integrate immigrants into Swedish society, including compulsory language and assimilationist tests, and for tougher stances against Islamism. He also opposes multiculturalism, arguing that it has been responsible for creating parallel societies or cultural exclusion within Sweden. He also accused the political left in Sweden of "pure racism" by expecting immigrants to be in favour of more immigration and has expressed support for voluntary repatriation measures for immigrants who do not wish to integrate. Farivar has also spoken out against the Islamic Nuance Party, claiming that it aims to expose culturally unassimilated immigrants in Sweden to Islamism.

Farivar also continues to comment on Iranian politics and as a student in Iran was active in libertarian and pro-freedom of speech student groups opposing the policies of the Iranian government. He has stated that much of his political beliefs were formed after hardline supporters of Mahmoud Ahmadinejad took over his university and suppressed opposition and that his family have been threatened in both Iran and Sweden for their support of dissident Iranian groups. He has criticized Swedish politicians on the left whom he argues are too friendly and soft towards the Iranian regime. He referred to Swedish Social Democratic Party foreign minister Ann Linde as "shameless" and "sick" for taking part in a 40th anniversary celebration of the Islamic Revolution in Iran. In 2022, along with SD politicians Markus Wiechel and Charlie Weimers he took part in a demonstration against the Iranian government in Stockholm.

References

See also 
 List of members of the Riksdag, 2022–2026

Swedish engineers
Iranian expatriates in Sweden
Swedish people of Iranian descent
Members of the Riksdag from the Sweden Democrats
1982 births
Living people
Members of the Riksdag 2022–2026
21st-century Swedish politicians